Timmer is a Dutch occupational surname, with the meaning of carpenter.

People with surname Timmer
Albert Timmer (born 1985), Dutch road racing cyclist
Ann Timmer (born 1960), American justice of the Arizona Supreme Court
Damien Timmer (born 1968), English business executive
Hendrik Timmer (1904–1998), Dutch tennis player
Hendrika Timmer (1926–1994), Dutch chess master
Henk Timmer (born 1971), Dutch football goalkeeper
Henry Timmer (born 1981), Dutch football goalkeeper
Henry W. Timmer (1873–1963), American (Wisconsin) politician
 (born 1933), Dutch business executive, CEO of Philips 1990–1996
 (born 1964), German physician and systems biologist
Kees Timmer (1903–1978), Dutch sculptor and painter
Maria Timmer (born 1987), American meteorologist, wife of Reed Timmer
Marianne Timmer (born 1974), Dutch speed skater
Mirjam Timmer (born 1982), Dutch singer-songwriter
Netty Witziers-Timmer (1923–2005), Dutch athlete
Reed Timmer (born 1980), American meteorologist
Theo Timmer (born 1949), Dutch motorcycle road racer
Timmers
Pieter Timmers (born 1988), Belgian freestyle swimmer
Ron Timmers (born 1973), Dutch football player and manager

Dutch-language surnames
Occupational surnames